Ebers is a surname. Notable people with the surname include:

Jewell James Ebers (1921–1959), American electrical engineer
John Ebers (1778–1858), English operatic manager
Georg Ebers (1837–1898), German Egyptologist and novelist

See also
Ebers Papyrus, an Ancient Egyptian papyrus purchased by Georg Ebers